Per Carlsen (1948 – 14 December 2020)  was the Ambassador Extraordinary and Plenipotentiary of the Kingdom of Denmark to Latvia from 2010 through 2015. In 1997-2001 he served as the Danish ambassador to Lithuania, and in 2005-2010 he served as the Danish ambassador to the Russian Federation.

See also 
 Embassy of Denmark in Moscow

References 

Danish diplomats
1948 births
2020 deaths
Ambassadors of Denmark to Russia
Recipients of the Order of the Cross of Terra Mariana, 3rd Class